The 1974 European Judo Championships were the 23rd edition of the European Judo Championships, and were held in London, Great Britain on 5 May 1974. Championships were subdivided into six individual competitions, and a separate team competition.

Medal overview

Individual

Teams

Medal table

References 
 Results of the 1974 European Judo Championships (JudoInside.com)

E
European Judo Championships
European Judo Championships
European Judo Championships
Judo competitions in the United Kingdom
International sports competitions in London
European Judo Championships